Anlaby or Anlaby Station is a pastoral lease located about  south east of Marrabel and  north of Kapunda in the state of South Australia.

History
The locality was first explored by Europeans in March 1838 by the party of Hill, Wood, Willis, and Oakden, who were scouting an overlanding route from the Murray.

The station is the oldest merino stud in Australia and was settled in 1839 by Capt. John Finnis, who called it "Mount Dispersion" (the Aboriginal name was Pudna), and stocked it with 12,000 sheep. The property was acquired in 1841 by Frederick Dutton, at which time it was at the frontier of European settlement. The neighbouring pastoralist to the west and north was W. S. Peter, while to the south was Bagot's Koonunga. To the east was the Murray scrub. A two-man mounted police station was established at Julia Creek between 1842 and 1846 to protect the Anlaby and Koonunga flocks from attacks by local Aboriginal people. The property ran as many as 70,000 sheep and shearing lasted nine months, employing 70 people.

In 1843 a log hut was constructed for the manager Alexander Buchanan. The name of the run was also changed by Dutton to Anlaby, the name of the Yorkshire village that his sister's husband hailed from. The homestead, comprising three interconnected wings, was constructed in 1861 for Alexander Buchanan.

Explorer John McKinlay stopped at Anlaby in August 1861 on the way north as part of South Australian Burke Relief Expedition. McKinlay later wrote, "this party met with the utmost kindness and consideration" from Alexander Buchanan, manager at Anlaby.

Another  from Anlaby was subdivided for wheat farming up until 1917. Returned servicemen were allocated another  between 1918 and 1922 in the Soldiers Settlement Scheme. 

Frederick Dutton died in 1890 and left Anlaby to his nephew Henry Dutton, who was responsible for making significant extensions to the house and gardens. Notably, Henry ordered an enormous conservatory be built in the gardens by A. Simpson & Son of Adelaide in 1891.

Henry's son, Henry Hampden Dutton (H.H. or "Harry"), inherited the property upon his death in 1914. Harry married the accomplished musician and socialite Emily Martin on 29 November 1905. Together they carried out extensive improvements at Anlaby, including the addition of a library in 1928, designed to hold the family's expanding collection of first edition books. A set of four oil paintings by Thomas Baines, who accompanied Augustus Gregory on his 1855 expedition to the Northern Territory, were acquired by Harry to hang above the library's fireplace. The library included complete sets such as James Cook's Voyages and John Gould's Mammals of Australia.

On Henry's death in 1932 Emily took over management of the station and the 1132 ewes she inherited.

Miles Franklin, describing the exotic trees in the gardens close to the house and the distinct lack of Australian natives, said it was like a ring around the house to keep Australia out.

The Anlaby Pastoral Company was formed in 1960 and took over control of the property. Partners were Emily Dutton (manager), John H. Dutton, Geoffrey P. Dutton, Helen Blackburn and Leonie Dutton. By 1968 the stud and property were acquired by the Mosey family. In early 2009 Andrew Morphett acquired the Anlaby Stud.

Managers of Anlaby Station 
Anlaby Station was managed by a succession of individuals when the property was owned by the Dutton family. The managers were: 

 Alexander Buchanan (3 November 1810 - 21 May 1865); served as manager from 1842 until his death in 1865. His son, Alexander Buchanan, became Master of the South Australian Supreme Court. 
 Henry Thomas Morris (21 November 1823 - 20 October 1911) a nephew of John Hindmarsh, and one of the original  immigrants of 1836. Served as manager at Anlaby following Buchanan's death, until 1890. Originally served as a stock inspector.
 Peter Mayoh Miller; served as manager under Henry Dutton, between 1890, and his retirement on 1 November 1895.
 Claude de Neufville Lucas (3 Oct 1873 - 26 April 1936); assumed position of manager following Miller's resignation. Served between 1895 and 1932. 
 Harry Edkins; manager until 1945. Prior to taking control of Anlaby, he managed Uno Station, Iron Knob, which was also owned by the Dutton family.
 Norman Bridle; manager from 1945.

Heritage listing

Anlaby Homestead and the Anlaby Shearing Shed, Slaughterhouse, Shearers' Quarters and Manager's House are both separately listed on the South Australian Heritage Register.

Heritage Gardens 
The 10-acre garden and arboretums at Anlaby contain the largest collection of National Trust registered heritage trees in one location under private ownership in Australia. There are 620 specimens, including Australian natives and exotic tree specimens from around the world. 

Some of the most important heritage-listed planting include: 

 Himalayan Cedar (Blue form) - Cedrus deodara
 Common Pistachio - Pistacia vera (Male)
 Siberian Elm - Ulmus pumila var. pumila
 Cut-leaf Turkey-oak - Quercus cerris
 Pashia Pear - Pyrus pashia
 Algerian Oak - Quercus canariensis
 Rough-barked Arizona Cypress - Hesperocyparis arizonica var. arizonica
 Common Yellowwood - Afrocarpus falcatus
 Golden Deodar Cedar - Cedrus deodara 'Aurea'''

Trees planted at Anlaby are listed at a local, regional, state, and national level.

In literature

The prolific author Geoffrey Dutton grew up at Anlaby, and includes information about his ancestors in his 1985 book The Squatters''.

See also
List of ranches and stations

References

Stations (Australian agriculture)
Pastoral leases in South Australia
Mid North (South Australia)
1839 establishments in Australia